Provati (Greek: Προβάτι) is an island of the Echinades, among the Ionian Islands group of Greece. , it had no resident population.

References

Echinades
Islands of Greece
Islands of the Ionian Islands (region)
Landforms of Ithaca